Françoiz Breut, also known as 08648046495, is the first album by the French singer Françoiz Breut, released in 1997. The songs were written by Dominique Ané, Breut's boyfriend at the time.

Critical reception
The Wall Street Journal thought that "Breut's clear soprano benefits from the soulful lyrics of her petit ami, in an excellent collaboration."

AllMusic wrote that "Breut's vocals are mostly quite confident, as she traverses a delicate noir path."

Track listing
 Tarifa (Dominique Ané) – 3:44
 Ma colère (Dominique Ané) – 5:31
 La rue ne te reprendra pas (Dominique Ané) – 3:17
 Everyone kisses a stranger (Dominique Ané/Françoiz Breut/Eric Deleporte/Sarah Froning) – 2:57
 La femme sans histoire (Dominique Ané) – 4:28
 Le Nord (Dominique Ané) – 8:23
 Motus (Dominique Ané) – 3:11
 Le don d’ubiquité (Dominique Ané) – 5:25
 Après la nuit (Dominique Ané) – 3:20
 My wedding man (Dominique Ané) – 2:21

(C) Lithium 1997 – digipak – 7 24384 42142 7
(C) Bella Union 1998 – digipak – BELLACD9 – [10 October 1998]

References

1997 albums
Françoiz Breut albums
Bella Union albums